Margaret Rae Morrison Luckock (October 15, 1893 – January 24, 1972) known as Rae Luckock was a feminist, social justice activist, peace activist and, with Agnes Macphail, one of the first two women elected to the Legislative Assembly of Ontario, in 1943. A member of the Co-operative Commonwealth Federation (Ontario Section), also known as the Ontario CCF, Luckock was elected to the Ontario legislature in the 1943 Ontario general election representing Toronto's Bracondale constituency (riding). She served as a Member of Provincial Parliament (MPP) until she was defeated in the 1945 Ontario general election. She became the Congress of Canadian Women's founding president in 1950 and became a victim  of the Cold War's anti-communist hysteria when she was denied entry into the United States, because she travelled to "Red" China and invited Soviet women to visit Canada. She contracted Parkinson's disease in the mid-1950s and mostly was bedridden until her death in 1972.

Background and early life
Luckock was raised on a family farm in Arthur, Ontario. Her father, James J. Morrison, was a founder of the United Farmers of Ontario and served as the party's general secretary during the UFO's years in power.

In 1914, she married Richard Luckock, a tool-and-die maker, and the couple ultimately settled in Toronto.

Luckock worked as a seamstress during the Great Depression but had to go on social relief when she became unemployed. During this period, her daughter contracted scarlet fever and died. The tragedy motivated Luckock's lifelong fight for social programs.

Co-operative Commonwealth Federation

Rae Luckock joined the Co-operative Commonwealth Federation (CCF) at its inception in 1932 and served as a local party activist. She ran for the Toronto school board several times before winning election as a trustee in 1943. Later that year she was the CCF's successful candidate in Bracondale for the provincial election and resigned her position on the school board.

Elected to Legislative Assembly of Ontario

The 1943 election was a major breakthrough for the Ontario CCF propelling them to official opposition status in a minority legislature with 34 seats.

Luckock and Agnes Macphail were both elected to the provincial legislature for the first time that year, the first women ever to serve as Members of Provincial Parliament (MPPs).  As new MPPs were usually sworn in in alphabetical order, Luckock was due to become the first woman ever sworn in as an MPP, but she deferred to Macphail in recognition of the latter's long career as a federal Member of Parliament. Luckock was thus the second woman to take the MPP's oath.

In the legislature, Luckock served as the CCF's education critic and promoted the idea of free university tuition and improved rural education. She also championed the equality of women by advocating equal pay for equal work and pay for homemakers.

Luckock was defeated in the 1945 provincial election which reduced the CCF caucus to only eight MPPs and third party status.

She served as president of the Housewives and Consumers Association (HCA) from 1943 to 1944, and organized its 1948 "March of a Million Names" campaign that petitioned the federal government to lower the price of consumer goods. A million names were gathered for the petition which was presented to Prime Minister William Lyon Mackenzie King by Luckock at a large rally on Parliament Hill. The campaign resulted in the federal government taking action against milling and baking companies for artificially fixing the price of bread.

Alleged Communist affiliations

Members of the communist Labor-Progressive Party were involved in the HCA leading it to be labelled a "communist front". The CCF had actively purged suspected Communists from its ranks since its founding and Luckock's involvement with the HCA brought her under suspicion and resulting in demands that she choose between leaving the HCA or being expelled from the CCF. Luckock chose the HCA and was expelled from the CCF in 1948. The party had a resurgence of fortunes in that year's provincial election and regained her riding of Bracondale but with Harry Walters as the new CCF standard-bearer instead of Luckock.

The HCA joined with other women's groups to form the Congress of Canadian Women in 1950, and Luckock was elected its first president. The Congress was involved with the peace movement during the Cold War, and facilitated meetings between people from the Soviet Union and Canadians, by inviting them to visit Canada.

Banned from US

Luckock attended conferences of the World Peace Council, including one in the People's Republic of China in 1956. As a result, she was blacklisted, and was once barred from entry into the United States. She successfully argued that she should be allowed in.

Luckock was diagnosed with Parkinson's disease shortly after her trip to China and spent the last years of her life in hospital.

See also
 List of peace activists

Citations

References
Biography from Libraries and Archives Canada
Famous Women of the Grand includes biographical article on Luckock
Dawber, Michael, After you Agnes: Mrs. Rae Luckock, MPP,  Tweed, Ont: Quinte-Web Press, c1994.
Sangster, Joan, Dreams of equality: women on the Canadian left, 1920-1950, Toronto : McClelland & Stewart, c1989.

External links

Canadian feminists
Ontario Co-operative Commonwealth Federation MPPs
20th-century Canadian politicians
Canadian pacifists
Canadian socialists
1893 births
1972 deaths
Women MPPs in Ontario
Canadian socialist feminists
Pacifist feminists
Toronto District School Board trustees